Leyment is a commune in the Ain department in eastern France.

Geography
The river Albarine forms part of the commune's northern border.

Population

See also
Communes of the Ain department

References

Communes of Ain
Ain communes articles needing translation from French Wikipedia